Percy Graham Buchanan Westmacott (1830 Edinburgh – 10 September 1917) was a British mechanical engineer.

He married Annette Beatrice (née Berners); they had children:
 Evelyn Westmacott (born c 1862)
 Henry A. Westmacott (born 1866)
 John Westmacott (born c 1873 )
 Lewis Westmacott (born 3 August 1871, died 27 November 1949) Married 20 April 1898, Evelyn Bayley, of Dublin.
 Mabel Westmacott (born c 1876)
 Rachel Westmacott (born c 1878)
 Gerald Westmacott (born c April 1880)

References

Sources
A Victorian Engineer: the life of Percy G. B. Westmacott (1830–1917), Editors Mabel Noble, Dorothy Boyd. 1973, Eyre and Spottiswoode Ltd.

External links

1830 births
1917 deaths
Scottish mechanical engineers
Engineers from Edinburgh
Presidents of the Smeatonian Society of Civil Engineers